This is a shortened version of the seventeenth chapter of the ICD-9: Diseases of the Digestive System. It covers ICD codes 800 to 999. The full chapter can be found on pages 473 to 546 of Volume 1, which contains all (sub)categories of the ICD-9. Volume 2 is an alphabetical index of Volume 1. Both volumes can be downloaded for free from the website of the World Health Organization.

Fracture of skull (800–804)
  Fracture of vault of skull
  Fracture of base of skull
  Fracture of face bones
  Other and unqualified skull fractures
  Multiple fractures involving skull or face with other bones

Fracture of neck and trunk (805–809)
  Fracture of vertebral column without mention of spinal cord injury
  Fracture of vertebral column with spinal cord injury
  Fracture of rib(s), sternum, larynx, and trachea
  Fracture of pelvis
  Ill-defined fractures of bones of trunk

Fracture of upper limb (810–819)
  Fracture of clavicle
  Fracture of scapula
  Fracture of humerus
  Fracture of radius and ulna
  Fracture of carpal bone(s)
  Fracture of metacarpal bone(s)
  Fracture of one or more Phalanges of the hand
  Multiple fractures of hand bones
  Ill-defined fractures of upper limb
  Multiple fractures involving both upper limbs, and upper limb with rib(s) and sternum

Fracture of lower limb (820–829)
  Fracture of neck of femur
  Fracture of other and unspecified parts of femur
  Fracture of patella
  Fracture of tibia and fibula
  Fracture of ankle
  Fracture of one or more tarsal and metatarsal bones
  Fracture of one or more phalanges of foot
  Other, multiple, and ill-defined fractures of lower limb
  Multiple fractures involving both lower limbs, lower with upper limb, and lower limb(s) with rib(s) and sternum
  Fracture of unspecified bones

Dislocation (830–839)
  Dislocation of jaw
  Dislocation of shoulder
  Dislocation of elbow
  Dislocation of wrist
  Dislocation of finger
  Dislocation of hip
  Dislocation of knee
  Dislocation of ankle
  Dislocation of foot
  Other, multiple, and ill-defined dislocations

Sprains and strains of joints and adjacent muscles (840–848)
  Sprains and strains of shoulder and upper arm
  Sprains and strains of elbow and forearm
  Sprains and strains of wrist and hand
  Sprains and strains of hip and thigh
  Sprains and strains of knee and leg
  Sprains and strains of ankle and foot
  Sprains and strains of sacroiliac region
  Sprains and strains of other and unspecified parts of back
  Other and ill-defined sprains and strains

Intracranial injury, excluding those with skull fracture (850–854)
  Concussion
  Cerebral laceration and contusion
  Subarachnoid, subdural, and extradural hemorrhage, following injury
  Other and unspecified intracranial hemorrhage following injury
  Intracranial injury of other and unspecified nature

Internal injury of thorax, abdomen, and pelvis (860–869)
  Traumatic pneumothorax and hemothorax
  Traumatic pneumothorax without open wound into thorax
  Traumatic pneumothorax with open wound into thorax
  Traumatic hemothorax without open wound into thorax
  Traumatic hemothorax with open wound into thorax
  Traumatic pneumohemothorax without open wound into thorax
  Traumatic pneumohemothorax with open wound into thorax
  Injury to heart and lung
  Heart injury without mention of open wound into thorax
  Heart injury with open wound into thorax
  Lung injury without mention of open wound into thorax
  Injury to bronchus without open wound into cavity
  Injury to esophagus without open wound into cavity
  Lung injury with open wound into thorax
  Injury to other and unspecified intrathoracic organs
  Injury to diaphragm without open wound into cavity
  Injury to diaphragm with open wound into cavity
  Injury to other specified intrathoracic organs without mention of open wound into cavity
  Injury to other specified intrathoracic organs with open wound into cavity
  Injury to gastrointestinal tract
  Injury to liver
  Injury to spleen
  Injury to kidney
  Injury to pelvic organs
  Injury to bladder and urethra without open wound into cavity
  Injury to bladder and urethra with open wound into cavity
  Injury to ureter without open wound into cavity
  Injury to ureter with open wound into cavity
  Injury to uterus without open wound into cavity
  Injury to uterus with open wound into cavity
  Injury to other intra-abdominal organs
  Injury to other intra-abdominal organs without mention of open wound into cavity
  Injury to unspecified intra-abdominal organ without open wound into cavity
  Injury to adrenal gland without open wound into cavity
  Injury to bile duct and gallbladder without open wound into cavity
  Injury to peritoneum without open wound into cavity
  Injury to retroperitoneum without open wound into cavity
  Injury to other and multiple intra-abdominal organs without open wound into cavity
  Injury to other intra-abdominal organs with open wound into cavity
  Internal injury to unspecified or ill-defined organs

Open wound of head, neck, and trunk (870–879)
  Open wound of ocular adnexa
  Open wound of eyeball
  Open wound of ear
  Other open wound of head
  Open wound of neck
  Open wound of chest (wall)
  Open wound of back
  Open wound of buttock
  Open wound of genital organs (external), including traumatic amputation
  Open wound of other and unspecified sites, except limbs

Open wound of upper limb (880–887)
  Open wound of shoulder and upper arm
  Open wound of elbow, forearm, and wrist
  Open wound of hand except finger(s) alone
  Open wound of finger(s)
  Multiple and unspecified open wound of upper limb
  Traumatic amputation of thumb (complete) (partial)
  Traumatic amputation of other finger(s) (complete) (partial)
  Traumatic amputation of arm and hand (complete) (partial)

Open wound of lower limb (890–897)
  Open wound of hip and thigh
  Open wound of knee, leg (except thigh), and ankle
  Open wound of foot except toe(s) alone
  Open wound of toe(s)
  Multiple and unspecified open wound of lower limb
  Traumatic amputation of toe(s)
  Traumatic amputation of foot
  Traumatic amputation of leg(s)

Injury to blood vessels (900–904)
  Injury to blood vessels of head and neck
  Injury to blood vessels of thorax
  Injury to blood vessels of abdomen and pelvis
  Injury to blood vessels of upper extremity
  Injury to blood vessels of lower extremity and unspecified sites

Late effects of injuries, poisonings, toxic effects, and other external causes (905–909)
  Late effects of musculoskeletal and connective tissue injuries
  Late effects of injuries to skin and subcutaneous tissues
  Late effects of injuries to the nervous system
  Late effects of other and unspecified injuries
  Late effects of other and unspecified external causes

Superficial injury (910–919)
  Superficial injury of face, neck, and scalp except eye
  Superficial injury of trunk
  Superficial injury of shoulder and upper arm
  Superficial injury of elbow, forearm, and wrist
  Superficial injury of hand(s) except finger(s) alone
  Superficial injury of finger(s)
  Superficial injury of hip, thigh, leg, and ankle
  Superficial injury of foot and toe(s)
  Superficial injury of eye and adnexa
  Superficial injury of other, multiple, and unspecified sites
  Abrasion or friction burn of other multiple and unspecified sites without infection
  Abrasion or friction burn of other multiple and unspecified sites infected
  Blister of other multiple and unspecified sites without infection
  Blister of other multiple and unspecified sites infected
  Insect bite nonvenomous of other multiple and unspecified sites without infection
  Insect bite nonvenomous of other multiple and unspecified sites infected
  Superficial foreign body (splinter) of other multiple and unspecified sites without major open wound and without infection
  Superficial foreign body (splinter) of other multiple and unspecified sites without major open wound infected
  Other and unspecified superficial injury of other multiple and unspecified sites without infection
  Other and unspecified superficial injury of other multiple and unspecified sites infected

Contusion with intact skin surface (920–924)
  Contusion of face, scalp, and neck except eye(s)
  Contusion of eye and adnexa
  Black eye not otherwise specified
  Contusion of trunk
  Contusion of upper limb
  Contusion of finger
  Contusion of lower limb and of other and unspecified sites
  Contusion of toe

Crushing injury (925–929)
  Crushing injury of face, scalp, and neck
  Crushing injury of trunk
  Crushing injury of upper limb
  Crushing injury of lower limb
  Crushing injury of multiple and unspecified sites

Effects of foreign body entering through Body orifice (930–939)
  Foreign body on external eye
  Foreign body, ear
  Foreign body, nose
  Foreign body in pharynx and larynx
  Foreign body in trachea, bronchus, and lung
  Foreign body in mouth, esophagus, and stomach
  Foreign body, intestine/colon
  Foreign body, anus/rectum
  Foreign body in digestive system, unspecified
  Foreign body in genitourinary tract

Burns (940–949)
  Burn confined to eye and adnexa
  Burn of face, head, and neck
  Burn of trunk
  Burn of upper limb, except wrist and hand
  Burn of wrist(s) and hand(s)
  Burn of lower limb(s)
  Burns of multiple specified sites
  Burn of internal organs
  Burns classified according to extent of body surface involved
  Burn, unspecified

Injury to nerves and spinal cord (950–957)
  Injury to optic nerve and pathways
  Injury to other cranial nerve(s)
  Spinal cord injury without evidence of spinal bone injury
  Injury to nerve roots and spinal plexus
  Injury to cervical nerve root
  Injury to dorsal nerve root
  Injury to lumbar nerve root
  Injury to sacral nerve root
  Injury to brachial plexus
  Injury to lumbosacral plexus
  Injury to multiple sites of nerve roots and spinal plexus
  Injury to unspecified site of nerve roots and spinal plexus
  Injury to other nerve(s) of trunk, excluding shoulder and pelvic girdles
  Injury to nerve(s) of shoulder girdle and upper limb
  Injury to axillary nerve
  Injury to median nerve
  Injury to ulnar nerve
  Injury to radial nerve
  Injury to musculocutaneous nerve
  Injury to cutaneous sensory nerve upper limb
  Injury to digital nerve upper limb
  Injury to other specified nerve(s) of shoulder girdle and upper limb
  Injury to multiple nerves of shoulder girdle and upper limb
  Injury to unspecified nerve of shoulder girdle and upper limb
  Injury to nerve(s) of pelvic girdle and lower limb
  Injury to other and unspecified nerves

Certain traumatic complications and unspecified injuries (958–959)
  Certain early complications of Physical trauma
  Air embolism as an early complication of trauma
  Fat embolism as an early complication of trauma
  Secondary and recurrent hemorrhage as an early complication of trauma
  Posttraumatic wound infection not elsewhere classified
  Traumatic shock
  Traumatic anuria
  Volkmann's ischemic contracture
  Traumatic subcutaneous emphysema
  Other early complications of trauma
  Traumatic compartment syndrome
  Injury, other and unspecified
  Other and unspecified injury to trunk
  Fracture of corpus cavernosum penis

Poisoning by drugs, medicinal and biological substances (960–979)
  Poisoning by antibiotics
  Poisoning by other anti-infectives
  Poisoning by hormones and synthetic substitutes
  Poisoning by primarily systemic agents
  Poisoning by agents primarily affecting blood constituents
  Poisoning by analgesics, antipyretics, and antirheumatics
  Poisoning by anticonvulsants and anti-Parkinsonism drugs
  Poisoning by sedatives and hypnotics
  Poisoning by other Central nervous system depressants and anesthetics
  Poisoning by psychotropic agents
  Poisoning by antidepressants
  Poisoning by phenothiazine-based tranquilizers
  Poisoning by butyrophenone-based tranquilizers
  Poisoning by other antipsychotics neuroleptics and major tranquilizers
  Poisoning by benzodiazepine-based tranquilizers
  Poisoning by other tranquilizers
  Poisoning by psychodysleptics (hallucinogens)
  Poisoning by psychostimulants
  Poisoning by other specified psychotropic agents
  Poisoning by unspecified psychotropic agent
  Poisoning by central nervous system stimulants
  Poisoning by drugs primarily affecting the autonomic nervous system
  Poisoning by agents primarily affecting the cardiovascular system
  Poisoning by agents primarily affecting the gastrointestinal system
  Poisoning by water, mineral, and uric acid metabolism drugs
  Poisoning by agents primarily acting on the smooth and skeletal muscles and respiratory system
  Poisoning by agents primarily affecting skin and mucous membrane, ophthalmological, otorhinolaryngological, and dental drugs
  Poisoning by other and unspecified drugs and medicinal substances
  Poisoning by bacterial vaccines
  Poisoning by other vaccines and biological substances

Toxic effects of substances chiefly nonmedicinal as to source (980–989)
  Toxic effect of alcohol
  Toxic effect of ethyl alcohol
  Toxic effect of methyl alcohol
  Toxic effect of isopropyl alcohol
  Toxic effect of fusel oil
  Toxic effect of other specified alcohols
  Toxic effect of unspecified alcohol
  Toxic effect of petroleum products
  Toxic effect of solvents other than petroleum based
  Toxic effect of benzene and homologues
  Toxic effect of carbon tetrachloride
  Toxic effect of carbon disulfide
  Toxic effect of other chlorinated hydrocarbon solvents
  Toxic effect of nitroglycol
  Toxic effect of other nonpetroleum-based solvents
  Toxic effect of corrosive aromatics, acids, and caustic alkalis
  Toxic effect of lead and its compounds (including fumes)
  Toxic effect of other metals
  Toxic effect of mercury and its compounds
  Toxic effect of arsenic and its compounds
  Toxic effect of manganese and its compounds
  Toxic effect of beryllium and its compounds
  Toxic effect of antimony and its compounds
  Toxic effect of cadmium and its compounds
  Toxic effect of chromium
  Toxic effect of other specified metals
  Toxic effect of unspecified metal
  Poisoning, carbon monoxide
  Toxic effect of other gases, fumes, or vapors
  Toxic effect of liquefied petroleum gas
  Toxic effect of other hydrocarbon gas
  Toxic effect of nitrogen oxides
  Toxic effect of sulfur dioxide
  Toxic effect of freon
  Toxic effect of lacrimogenic gas
  Toxic effect of chlorine gas
  Toxic effect of hydrocyanic acid gas
  Toxic effect of noxious substances eaten as food
  Toxic effect of fish and shellfish eaten as food
  Toxic effect of mushrooms eaten as food
  Toxic effect of berries and other plants eaten as food
  Toxic effect of other specified noxious substances eaten as food
  Toxic effect of unspecified noxious substance eaten as food
  Toxic effect of other substances, chiefly nonmedicinal as to source
  Hydrocyanic acid and cyanides
  Strychnine and salts
  Chlorinated hydrocarbons
  Organophosphate and carbamate
  Other pesticides, not elsewhere classified
  Venom
 Bites of venomous snakes, lizards, and spiders
 Tick paralysis
  Soaps and detergents
  Aflatoxin and other mycotoxin (food contaminants)
  Other substances, chiefly nonmedicinal as to source
  Unspecified substance, chiefly nonmedicinal as to source

Other and unspecified effects of external causes (990–995)
  Effects of radiation, unspecified
  Effects of reduced temperature
  Frostbite, unspec./other
  Chilblains
  Hypothermia
  Effects of heat and light
  Heat stroke
  Heat exhaustion
  Effects of air pressure
  Barotrauma, otitic
  Effects of other external causes
  Effects of lightning
  Drowning and nonfatal submersion
  Effects of neoplasms
  Effects of thirst
  Exhaustion due to exposure
  Exhaustion due to excessive exertion
  Motion sickness
  Asphyxiation and strangulation
  Electrocution and nonfatal effects of electric current
  Other effects of external causes
  Certain adverse effects not elsewhere classified
  Anaphylaxis
  Angioneurotic edema
  Medication, adverse effects, unspec.
  Unspecified adverse effect of unspecified drug, medicinal and biological substance
  Arthus phenomenon
  Unspecified adverse effect of anesthesia
  Unspecified adverse effect of insulin
  Other drug allergy
  Unspecified adverse effect of other drug, medicinal and biological substance
  Allergy, unspec.
  Shock due to anesthesia not elsewhere classified
  Child abuse, unspec.
  Shaken infant syndrome
  Anaphylactic shock due to adverse food reaction
  Anaphylactic shock due to unspecified food
  Anaphylactic shock due to peanuts
  Anaphylactic shock due to crustaceans
  Anaphylactic shock due to fruits and vegetables
  Anaphylactic shock due to tree nuts and seeds
  Anaphylactic shock due to fish
  Anaphylactic shock due to food additives
  Anaphylactic shock due to milk products
  Anaphylactic shock due to eggs
  Anaphylactic shock due to other specified food
  Other adverse food reactions not elsewhere classified
  Other specified adverse effects not elsewhere classified
  Adult physical abuse
 Battered person syndrome
  Adult emotional/psychological abuse
  Adult sexual abuse
  Malignant hyperthermia
  Other specified adverse effects not elsewhere classified
  Systemic inflammatory response syndrome
  Sepsis

Complications of surgical and medical care, not elsewhere classified (996–999)
  Complications peculiar to certain specified procedures
  Complications affecting specified body systems, not elsewhere classified
  Other complications of procedures, NEC
  Complications of medical care, not elsewhere classified
  Air embolism as a complication of medical care not elsewhere classified
  Other transfusion reaction not elsewhere classified
 Postperfusion syndrome NEC

International Classification of Diseases